The 2012 Minnesota Swarm season was the eighth season of the Minnesota Swarm, a lacrosse team based in Saint Paul, Minnesota playing in the National Lacrosse League.

After a 3–3 start, the Swarm fired coach Mike Lines, naming Associate General Manager Joe Sullivan as the new head coach. No reason was given for the move.

Regular season

Conference standings

Game log
Reference:

Playoffs

Game log
Reference:

Transactions

Trades

Dispersal Draft
The Swarm chose the following players in the Boston Blazers dispersal draft:

Entry draft
The 2011 NLL Entry Draft took place on September 21, 2011. The Swarm selected the following players:

Roster

See also
2012 NLL season

References

Minnesota Swarm seasons
2012 in lacrosse
2012 in sports in Minnesota